Hamamelis mollis, also known as Chinese witch hazel, is a species of flowering plant in the witch hazel family Hamamelidaceae, native to central and eastern China, in Anhui, Guangxi, Hubei, Hunan, Jiangxi, Sichuan, and Zhejiang.

The Latin term  means "soft", and refers to the felted leaves, which turn yellow in autumn.

Cultivation and uses

H. mollis is widely grown as an ornamental plant, valued for the strongly-scented flowers appearing in winter when little else is growing. Numerous cultivars have been selected, for variation in flower colour and size, and in shrub size and habit. It is also one of the two parents of the popular garden hybrid H. × intermedia (the other parent is H. japonica).

The cultivars ‘Jermyns Gold’ and ‘Wisley Supreme’  have gained the Royal Horticultural Society’s Award of Garden Merit.

References

External links
Witch Hazels at Timber Press

Hamamelidaceae
Endemic flora of China
Trees of China
Taxa named by Daniel Oliver